Jazz Time  is a studio album released by Red Nichols and his Five Pennies in 1950 on Capitol 10-inch LP record H 215.  It was also released as 45rpm set EBF-215.  The album features traditional jazz, or as one review put it, "dixieland madness".

Track listing 
 Glory, Hallelujah (traditional)
 When You Wish Upon a Star (Leigh Harline - Ned Washington)
 Little By Little (Walter O'Keefe - Bobby Dolan)
 You're My Everything (Warren - Dixon - Young)
 Love Is the Sweetest Thing (Ray Noble)
 If I Had You (Shapiro - Cambell - Connelly)
 River-Boat Shuffle (Voynow - Carmichael - Mills)

References

1950 albums
Capitol Records albums
Dixieland albums